Rafael Rullán Ribera (born January 8, 1952) is a Spanish retired professional basketball player. A talented center, whose versatility and range helped him to also play the power forward position, he was one of the stars of Real Madrid, throughout the seventies and the eighties.

Club career
Rullán was a major contributor to Real's three EuroLeague titles in 1974, 1978, and 1980, as well as their FIBA Saporta Cup title in 1984. He had a memorable performance, with 27 points in the 1980 EuroLeague Final, against Maccabi Tel Aviv. He won 14 Spanish League championships, and 9 Spanish King's Cup titles, in his 18 seasons with the club.

National team career
Rullán also shined with the senior Spain men's national basketball team, playing in 161 games, and winning the silver medal at the EuroBasket 1973.

External links 
FIBA Profile
FIBA Europe Profile
The Legend, Real Madrid: Rafael Rullan
Real Madrid Legend Profile
Spanish League Profile 
  

1952 births
Living people
Basketball players at the 1972 Summer Olympics
Centers (basketball)
Liga ACB players
Olympic basketball players of Spain
Power forwards (basketball)
Real Madrid Baloncesto players
Spanish men's basketball players
1974 FIBA World Championship players
Sportspeople from Palma de Mallorca